There are at least four nationwide operating Scouting and Guiding organizations in Colombia:

 Asociación Scouts de Colombia (Scout Association of Colombia); member of the World Organization of the Scout Movement; co-educational, 13,348 members
 Asociación de Guías Scouts de Colombia (Girl Scout Association of Colombia); member of the World Association of Girl Guides and Girl Scouts; girls-only, 627 members
 Corporación Scouts de Antioquia (Scouts Corporation of Antioquia, CSA), operating in the province of Antioquia, divided in districts inside the region whose main center is in the metropolitan city of Medellín. The CSA traces its origin to the beginning of the Boy Scouts in Colombia with Sir Jorge Cock Quevedo in 1918. More than 1,500 Scouts are currently enrolled in this movement.
 Asociación Colombiana de Escultismo (Colombian Scout Association, Scouts ACE); member of the World Federation of Independent Scouts

External links
 Corporación Scouts de Antioquia
 Asociación Colombiana de Escultismo